The Transport Act (Northern Ireland) 1967 (c 37) (NI) is an Act of the Parliament of Northern Ireland which Deals with Public Transport including Roads, Trains and Buses and which established The Northern Ireland Transport Holdings Company which trades as Translink a government-owned body which Manages Trains and Buses in Northern Ireland.

Arrangement of Act

PART I 
 repealed  by The General Consumer Council (Northern Ireland) Order 1984 (ART 5, Paragraph 2) which dissolved the Transport Users Committee established under Section 1 of the Act and transferred the Functions under Sections 6(2) and (3), 59(1) and (2) and 60(2) of that Committee to the General Consumer Council

PART II - Carriage Of Passengers By Road  

 PART II is Excluded by Section 54(3) of  The Taxis Act (Northern Ireland) 2008
 Functions under PART II transferred to the Department For Infrastructure from the Department Of The Environment under Schedule 5, Part II Of the Departments (Transfer of Functions) Order (Northern Ireland) 2016 
 
 Section 4. Road service licences
 Section 5. Particulars to be provided by applicants for road service licences.
 (b) and (c) Repealed on 5.10.2015 under Section 19 of The Transport Act (Northern Ireland) 2011
 Section 6. Functions as to grant of road service licences.
 (1)(a),(b),(h),(i), (2) and (3) repealed on 5.10.2015 by Section 20, Subsection (b) paragraph (ii) of The Transport Act (Northern Ireland) 2011
 Section 6A. Refusal of road service licence in certain cases.
 7A. Conditions as to matters required to be notified
 (2) repealed on 18.8.2014 by Regulation 9, 5 (b) of The Road Passenger Transport (Qualifications of Operators) Regulations (Northern Ireland) 2014 
  Section 8. Duration of road service licences.
 (3) repealed on 5.10.2015 by Section 9, Subsection 5 of The Transport Act (Northern Ireland) 2011
Section 9. Fees for road service licences.
 Section 10. Revocation and suspension of road service licences.
 (3B) and (3C) Repealed on 18.8.2014 by Regulation 9, (6)(c) of The Road Passenger Transport (Qualifications of Operators) Regulations (Northern Ireland) 2014
 Section 10B. Permits in relation to buses used by educational and other bodies.
 Section 10C. Further provision with respect to permits under section 10B.
 Section 10D. Permits under section 10B: regulations.
 Section 11. Powers to make grants to operators of road passenger transport services.
 repealed on 22.4.2013 by Schedule 2 (Repeals) of The Transport Act (Northern Ireland) 2011
 Section 12.
 repealed on 19.02.1985 by Schedule 3 (Repeals) of The Road Traffic, Transport and Roads (Northern Ireland) Order 1984
 Section 13.
 repealed by Section 2, Article 2, paragraph (11) of The Transport (Northern Ireland) Order 1977

PART III
 The Whole of PART III was repealed on 1.7.2012 by SCHEDULE 4 (repeals) of The General Consumer Council (Northern Ireland) Order 2010

PART IV - General Provisions Relating to Licences Under Part II and III
 Section 31. Records of licences.
 Section 32. Copies of licences.
 Section 33. Transfer of licences.
 Section 34. Forgery of licences.
 Section 35. False statements.
 (d) Repealed on 1.7.2012 by SCHEDULE 4 (repeals) of The General Consumer Council (Northern Ireland) Order 2010
 Section 36. Disclosure of information.
 Section 37. Inspectors and powers of entry
 (1) Repealed on 12.07.1997 by SCHEDULE 4 (Repeals) of The Road Traffic (Northern Ireland) Order 1995 
 Section 38. Obtaining of information etc. by inspectors.
 Section 39. Power to seize certain articles.
 (3)(a) and (4) repealed on 1.7.2012 by SCHEDULE 4 (repeals) of The General Consumer Council (Northern Ireland) Order 2010
 Section 40. Obstruction of inspectors.
 Section 41. Authorisation of inspectors.
 Section 42. Functions of police.
 Section 43. Prosecutions. 
 Section 44.
 Repealed on 2.7.1990 by SCHEDULE 3 (Repeals) of  The Transport (Amendment) (Northern Ireland) Order 1990
 Section 45. Regulations for purposes of Parts II, III and IV.
 Section 46. Interpretation of “carriage for reward” for purposes of [Part 2] and this Part.
 (c), (d) and (e) repealed on 1.7.2012 by SCHEDULE 4 (repeals) of The General Consumer Council (Northern Ireland) Order 2010
 Section 46A. Interpretation of certain expressions in Parts II and III.
 Repealed on 18.8.2014 by Section 9 (8) of The Road Passenger Transport (Qualifications of Operators) Regulations (Northern Ireland) 2014
 Section 46B. Good repute
 Section 46C. Financial standing of road freight and road passenger transport operators
 Section 46D. Professional competence of road passenger transport operators
 Section 46E. Professional competence of road freight operators 
 Repealed on 1.7.2012 by SCHEDULE 4 (repeals) of The General Consumer Council (Northern Ireland) Order 2010
 Section 46F. Savings* 
 Repealed on 18.8.2014 by Section 9 (12) of The Road Passenger Transport (Qualifications of Operators) Regulations (Northern Ireland) 2014

PART V  - The Northern Ireland Transport Holding Company  
 Section 47. Establishment of the Northern Ireland Transport Holding Company.
 Section 48. General functions of the Holding Company.* 
 Section 49. Power to Minister to give directions as to policy and control by the Holding Company of its subsidiaries* 
 Section 50. Surplus Funds of the Holding Company.* 
 Section 51. Borrowing powers of the Holding Company* 
 Section 52. Accounts, audit and returns.* 
 Section 53. Supplemental provisions as to the Holding Company and its subsidiaries.* 
 Section 54. Pension schemes.* 
 Section 55. Provision of railway services.
 Section 56. Powers of the railway undertaking.
 Section 57. Power of railway undertaking to made byelaws.
 Section 58
 repealed on 19.02.1985 by Schedule 3 (Repeals) of The Road Traffic, Transport and Roads (Northern Ireland) Order 1984
 Section 59. Complaints as to inadequacy of railway services.
 Section 60. Discontinuance of railway services.
 Section 61. Abandonment of railway lines.
 (2)(a) and (b) and (4) repealed on 19.02.1985 by Schedule 3 (Repeals) of The Road Traffic, Transport and Roads (Northern Ireland) Order 1984
 Section 62. Powers of acquisition where railway diverted for road purposes.
 (1) repealed on 17.02.1994 by SCHEDULE 11 (Repeals) of The The Roads (Northern Ireland) Order 1993
 Section 63. Exchequer grants to meet capital expenditure of the railway undertaking.
 Section 64. Financial assistance by Holding Company to the railway undertaking.
 Section 65. Trespass on premises of the railway undertaking.
 Section 66. Safety arrangements at level crossings.
 Section 67. Supplemental provisions as to the railway undertaking.*

PART VA - Construction Of Railways
 Section 67A. Construction of railways.
 Section 67B. Acquisition of land by Holding Company.
 Section 67C. Information as to ownership of premises.
 Section 67D. Power to enter land.
 Section 67E. Supplementary provisions relating to section 67D.
 Section 67F. Extinguishment of public rights of way.
 Section 67G. Diversion of navigable watercourses.
 Section 67I. Orders under sections 67A(2), 67G(1) and 67H
 Section 67J. Incorporation of Railways Clauses Consolidation Act, 1845 and Railways Clauses Act, 1863

PART VB - Penalty Fares On Buses and Trains 
 Section 67K. Operation of Schedule 1B.

PART VI - Distribution Of The Undertaking of the Authority 
 Section 68. Vesting of the Authority's undertaking in the Holding Company
 Section 69. Transfer or letting of property of the Holding Company to the railway undertaking.
 Section 70. upplementary provisions as to the letting of property by the Holding Company to the railway undertaking.

PART VII
 The Whole of PART VII was repealed on 19.02.1985 by Schedule 3 (Repeals) of The Road Traffic, Transport and Roads (Northern Ireland) Order 1984

PART VIII - Miscellaneous and General 
 Section 75. Termination of Transport Tribunal.
 (3) and (4) repealed by The Statute Law (Repeals) Act 1976
 Section 75A. Grants for transport facilities and services.
 repealed on 22.4.2013 by Schedule 2 (Repeals) of The Transport Act (Northern Ireland) 2011
 Section 76
 repealed on 19.02.1985 by Schedule 3 (Repeals) of The Road Traffic, Transport and Roads (Northern Ireland) Order 1984
 Section 77
 repealed by The Statute Law (Repeals) Act 1976
 Section 78. Regulations.
 Section 79
 (1) Amended Section 2 of The Motor Vehicles and Road Traffic Act (Northern Ireland) 1930
 (2)repealed on 19.02.1985 by Schedule 3 (Repeals) of The Road Traffic, Transport and Roads (Northern Ireland) Order 1984
 (3) Repealed by The Road Traffic (Northern Ireland) Order 1981
 Section 80. Saving for powers of Minister of Transport, etc.
 Section 81. Interpretation.
 definitions of "goods", "operators' licences", road freight operators" and "vehicle licences" repealed (1.7.2012)  by SCHEDULE 4 (repeals) of The General Consumer Council (Northern Ireland) Order 2010
 definition of "road service licence" repealed (5.10.2015) by Schedule 2 (Repeals) of The Transport Act (Northern Ireland) 2011
 Section 82.
 repealed on 19.02.1985 by Schedule 3 (Repeals) of The Road Traffic, Transport and Roads (Northern Ireland) Order 1984
 Section 83. Short title and commencement

SCHEDULE 1 - The Northern Ireland Transport Holding Company

SCHEDULE 1A - Modifications Of[Articles 133(2) AND (4) Of, And SCHEDULE 8 To, The Roads (Northern Ireland) Order 1993] For The Purposes Of SECTIONS 67A, 67G AND 67H
 3 (a), (b)(i) and (d) Repealed on 11.02.1994 by Schedule 11 (Repeals) of The Roads (Northern Ireland) Order 1993

SCHEDULE 1B - Provisions For Penalty Fares On Buses and Trains

SCHEDULE 2 
 repealed on 19.02.1985 by Schedule 3 (Repeals) of The Road Traffic, Transport and Roads (Northern Ireland) Order 1984

References 

Acts of the Parliament of Northern Ireland 1967
Railway Acts
Transport policy in the United Kingdom
History of transport in the United Kingdom
legislation